Vishal Punna (born 14 January 1984) is an Indian former professional tennis player.

Punna was raised in Hyderabad and featured in one Davis Cup tie for India, against New Zealand away in Invercargill in 2007. He was called upon for a live reverse singles, which he lost to Mark Nielsen, before Leander Paes won the tie for India in the fifth rubber.

Following his retirement from tennis, Punna lived in the United States and worked in the IT industry, before quitting to pursue a career in Indian cinema. He was the lead actor in the 2019 Telugu film Sarovaram.

See also
List of India Davis Cup team representatives

References

External links
 
 
 

1984 births
Living people
Indian male tennis players
Telugu male actors
Racket sportspeople from Hyderabad, India
Male actors from Hyderabad, India